William Thomas James Martin (27 April 1883–1954) was an English footballer who played in the Football League for Clapton Orient, Hull City, Oldham Athletic and Stockport County.

References

1883 births
1954 deaths
English footballers
Association football forwards
English Football League players
Millwall F.C. players
Hull City A.F.C. players
Leyton Orient F.C. players
Stockport County F.C. players
Oldham Athletic A.F.C. players